City municipal corporations of Tamil Nadu are the local governing bodies of the cities in Tamil Nadu.  There are 21 municipal corporations in the state.

List of municipal corporations

See also

 Municipal corporation (India)
 List of most populous metropolitan areas in India
 List of most populous cities in India

Notes

References 
 Indian Census

Municipal corporations in Tamil Nadu
Tamil Nadu politics-related lists
Municipal corporation
Local government-related lists